In mathematics and theoretical physics, a pseudo-Euclidean space is a finite-dimensional real -space together with a non-degenerate quadratic form . Such a quadratic form can, given a suitable choice of basis , be applied to a vector , giving
 which is called the scalar square of the vector .

For Euclidean spaces, implying that the quadratic form is positive-definite. When ,  is an isotropic quadratic form, otherwise it is anisotropic. Note that if , then , so that  is a null vector.

As with the term Euclidean space, the term pseudo-Euclidean space may be used to refer to an affine space or a vector space depending on the author, with the latter alternatively being referred to as a pseudo-Euclidean vector space (see point–vector distinction).

Geometry 
The geometry of a pseudo-Euclidean space is consistent despite some properties of Euclidean space not applying, most notably that it is not a metric space as explained below. The affine structure is unchanged, and thus also the concepts line, plane and, generally, of an affine subspace (flat), as well as line segments.

Positive, zero, and negative scalar squares

A null vector is a vector for which the quadratic form is zero. Unlike in a Euclidean space, such a vector can be non-zero, in which case it is self-orthogonal.
When the pseudo-Euclidean space provides a model for spacetime (see below), the null cone is called the light cone of the origin.

Interval
The quadratic form  corresponds to the square of a vector in the Euclidean case. To define the vector norm (and distance) in an invariant manner, one has to get square roots of scalar squares, which leads to possibly imaginary distances; see square root of negative numbers. But even for a triangle with positive scalar squares of all three sides (whose square roots are real and positive), the triangle inequality does not hold in general.

Hence terms norm and distance are avoided in pseudo-Euclidean geometry, which may be replaced with scalar square and interval respectively.

Though, for a curve whose tangent vectors all have scalar squares of the same sign, the arc length is defined. It has important applications: see proper time, for example.

Rotations and spheres

The rotations group of such space is indefinite orthogonal group , also denoted as  without a reference to particular quadratic form. Such "rotations" preserve the form  and, hence, the scalar square of each vector including whether it is positive, zero, or negative.

Such a hypersurface, called a quasi-sphere, is preserved by the appropriate indefinite orthogonal group.

Symmetric bilinear form
The quadratic form  gives rise to a symmetric bilinear form defined as follows:
 
The quadratic form can be expressed in terms of the bilinear form: .

This bilinear form is often referred to as the scalar product, and sometimes as "inner product" or "dot product", but it does not define an inner product space and it does not have the properties of the dot product of Euclidean vectors.

The standard basis of the real -space is orthogonal. There are no orthonormal bases in a pseudo-Euclidean space for which the bilinear form is indefinite, because it cannot be used to define a vector norm.

Subspaces and orthogonality
  is either positive or negative definite. Then,  is essentially Euclidean (up to the sign of ).
  is indefinite, but non-degenerate. Then,  is itself pseudo-Euclidean.
  is degenerate.

One of the most jarring properties (for a Euclidean intuition) of pseudo-Euclidean vectors and flats is their orthogonality. When two non-zero Euclidean vectors are orthogonal, they are not collinear. The intersections of any Euclidean linear subspace with its orthogonal complement is the  subspace. But the definition from the previous subsection immediately implies that any vector  of zero scalar square is orthogonal to itself. Hence, the isotropic line  generated by a null vector ν is a subset of its orthogonal complement .

The formal definition of the orthogonal complement of a vector subspace in a pseudo-Euclidean space gives a perfectly well-defined result, which satisfies the equality  due to the quadratic form's non-degeneracy. It is just the condition
  or, equivalently,  all space,

which can be broken if the subspace  contains a null direction. While subspaces form a lattice, as in any vector space, this  operation is not an orthocomplementation, in contrast to inner product spaces.

  or, equivalently, .

Such a subspace can have up to  dimensions.

For a (positive) Euclidean -subspace its orthogonal complement is a -dimensional negative "Euclidean" subspace, and vice versa.
Generally, for a -dimensional subspace  consisting of  positive and  negative dimensions (see Sylvester's law of inertia for clarification), its orthogonal "complement"  has  positive and  negative dimensions, while the rest  ones are degenerate and form the  intersection.

Parallelogram law and Pythagorean theorem
The parallelogram law takes the form

Using the square of the sum identity, for an arbitrary triangle one can express the scalar square of the third side from scalar squares of two sides and their bilinear form product:

This demonstrates that, for orthogonal vectors, a pseudo-Euclidean analog of the Pythagorean theorem holds:

Angle

This causes similar problems with definition of angle (see ) as appeared above for distances.

If  (only one positive term in ), then for vectors of positive scalar square:
 

which permits definition of the hyperbolic angle, an analog of angle between these vectors through inverse hyperbolic cosine:

It corresponds to the distance on a -dimensional hyperbolic space. This is known as rapidity in the context of theory of relativity discussed below.

There is no reasonable definition of the angle between a null vector and another vector (either null or non-null).

Algebra and tensor calculus 
Like Euclidean spaces, every pseudo-Euclidean vector space generates a Clifford algebra.

Just like over any vector space, there are pseudo-Euclidean tensors. Like with a Euclidean structure, there are raising and lowering indices operators but, unlike the case with Euclidean tensors, there is no bases where these operations do not change values of components. If there is a vector , the corresponding covariant vector is:
 

and with the standard-form
 

The correspondence between contravariant and covariant tensors makes a tensor calculus on pseudo-Riemannian manifolds a generalization of one on Riemannian manifolds.

Examples 
A very important pseudo-Euclidean space is Minkowski space, which is the mathematical setting in which Albert Einstein's theory of special relativity is formulated. For Minkowski space,  and  so that

 

The geometry associated with this pseudo-metric was investigated by Poincaré. Its rotation group is the Lorentz group. The Poincaré group includes also translations and plays the same role as Euclidean groups of ordinary Euclidean spaces.

Another pseudo-Euclidean space is the plane  consisting of split-complex numbers, equipped with the quadratic form

 

This is the simplest case of an indefinite pseudo-Euclidean space and the only one where the null cone dissects the space to four open sets. The group  consists of so named hyperbolic rotations.

See also
 Pseudo-Riemannian manifold
 Hyperbolic equation
 Hyperboloid model
 Paravector

Footnotes

References

Werner Greub (1963) Linear Algebra, 2nd edition, §12.4 Pseudo-Euclidean Spaces, pp. 237–49, Springer-Verlag.
Walter Noll (1964) "Euclidean geometry and Minkowskian chronometry", American Mathematical Monthly 71:129–44.

External links 
 D.D. Sokolov (originator), Pseudo-Euclidean space, Encyclopedia of Mathematics

Lorentzian manifolds